Crewdson is a surname. Notable people with the name include:
 Bob Crewdson, English footballer
Charles Crewdson, English engineer and company chairman, grandson of Eric
 Eric Crewdson (died 1967), English engineer, grandfather of Charles
 Gregory Crewdson (born 1962), American photographer
 Isaac Crewdson, (1780–1844), minister, schismatic author
 Jane Crewdson (1808–1863), Cornish poet
 John M. Crewdson (born 1945), American reporter